Cleo & Cuquin, known in Latin America as Cleo & Cuquin: Familia Telerin, is a preschool animated television series produced by Ánima Kitchent in cooperation with Televisa for RTVE. A reboot of the classic Familia Telerín series, it debuted in Spain on Clan on January 7, 2018.

Premise 
The series follows an eight-year-old girl named Cleo and her youngest brother, Cuquin, as they help their other siblings solve the problems they encounter. At the end of each episode, Cleo uses the lessons learned from them to help her determine what she wants to be when she grows up.

Characters

Main
 Cleo (voiced by Hayley Maki) is the oldest of six siblings and is eight years old. Her favorite thing in the world is playing, and with her vivid imagination, she turns everything into an adventure.
 Cuquin (voiced by Ruben Ray) is the smallest; he is one year old. He is an adorable little scamp, a tireless, playful baby who just won't sit still.
 Colitas (voiced by Kenna Pickard) is the little sister and is still learning to talk. She is three years old. She's all heart and loves to share everything she has, she is empathetic and optimistic, and is a huge nature-lover.
 Pelusin (voiced by Hunter Maki) is the artist of the family. He is five years old. He is easygoing, creative and very sensitive.
 Maripí (voiced by Emily Emmersen, later voiced by Savannah Beattie) is very neat, clean, and, above all, theatrical to the core. She is six years old. She loves to be the center of attention.
 Teté (voiced by Austin Nash Chase) is a bookworm: intelligent, a bit of a know-it-all, who loves to read, study and learn new things... and then show off about how much he knows. He is seven years old.

Adult characters do not appear in the series.

Pets
 Tomato is the family dog. He loves to bury things and goes crazy for sticks.
 Ghost is a white rabbit, playful, bouncy and really smart.

Episodes 
The series debuted on January 7, 2018, and consists of two seasons.

Season 1 
 The Première
 Ghostcatchers
 Driving Pelusin
 Hiccup Monsters
 Doublé Plié
 Elementary Dear Colitas
 Magic Cleo
 The Championship
 The Flower
 Flying Tooth
 A Day at the Beach
 Meteor Shower
 Power Up
 Pijama´s Party
 Digging
 My Little Big Band
 Gym Challenge
 Ghost Love
 Colitas' Bee Day
 Tete's Project
 The Ball
 The First Day of Spring
 Happy Birthday
 Learning to Ride
 The Big Game
 Trapped by the Flowers
 The Accident
 Afternoon TV
 Out on a Limb
 Christmas Day
 The Vegetable Mystery
 The Race
 The Big Freeze
 Toy Er
 Off to School
 Delivery
 Juice, Please!!
 The Photo Album
 The Secret Is in the Sauce
 Sea Adventure
 Anyone Can Draw
 Sit!
 She Knight
 Everyone Vs Cleo
 A Halloween Nightmare
 Little Paper Planes
 The Legend of Captain Clawl
 Pool Party
 Cops and Robbers
 Watering Day
 Flute Age
 Here Comes the Wolf!

Season 2 
 The Spaceship
 Snowy Search
 Marisphinx
 The Egg
 The Video Game
 Goals on Ice
 Arctic Architecture
 Cleo's Circus
 Vacation Time
 Evening Adventure
 Tree House TLC
 A Spacetastic Birthday 
 Tete's glasses
 Odín's Giant Egg
 Ghoul School
 A Gigantic World
 A New Friend
 Hidden Treasures
 Winter Games
 The Mystery of the Shed
 Save the Forest!
 The Dance
 A Picnic by the Lake
 Say Cheese
 Big Foot's Big Itch
 The Blackout

Broadcast 
The series began airing on January 7, 2018 on Clan and on January 22, 2018 on Nick Jr. in the United States. It premiered on the Discovery Kids channel in Latin America on March 5, 2018 and on Netflix worldwide and premiered on Treehouse TV in Canada on April 5, 2019.

Merchandise 
The show has merchandising agreements with toy partners with Fisher-Price, Mattel and book partners with Penguin Random House. In 2019, Toy Plus was named as master toy licensee for the brand.

References

External links 
 
 
 
 

2018 Spanish television series debuts
2018 Mexican television series debuts
2010s Mexican television series
2010s animated television series
Mexican children's animated adventure television series
Mexican children's animated comedy television series
Mexican children's animated fantasy television series
Spanish children's animated adventure television series
Spanish children's animated comedy television series
Spanish children's animated fantasy television series
Nick Jr. original programming
Treehouse TV original programming
Animated preschool education television series
2010s preschool education television series
Animated television series about children
Animated television series about siblings
Spanish preschool education television series